Paris Commercial Historic District may refer to:

Paris Commercial Historic District (Paris, Arkansas), listed on the National Register of Historic Places in Logan County, Arkansas
Paris Commercial Historic District (Paris, Tennessee), listed on the National Register of Historic Places in Henry County, Tennessee
Paris Commercial Historic District (Paris, Texas), listed on the National Register of Historic Places in Lamar County, Texas